Circus World is an Irish documentary series, produced by Fubar Films and screened on RTÉjr. The series premiered on Monday 4 July 2016. 
It follows the adventures of three children as they travel around Ireland with their mum and dad’s circus. The series is produced by Fiona Bergin and filmed and directed by Fintan Connolly.

Plot 
Set in and around a real Irish circus, Blake (10), Michael (8), Isabella (5) and their parents Mikey and Tara Gerbola are the hosts. The ten part series follows the adventures of these three lively children as they travel all around Ireland putting up their tent.
 
Each episode features a circus performer and their big top performance. We meet the different circus artistes – who come from all over the world – and observe the children try out new skills. Among the acts and activities featured are: clowning, acrobatics, wire walking, roller skating, magic, juggling, slapstick, flying, gymnastics and finale.

Each episode culminates with an entertaining aspect of the children’ s life on the road. They are in a different county every day.

Tagline 
Brings all the fun and excitement of the circus to your screen.

Episodes

Series 1 (2016)

References

External links 
 
 Circus World trailer 

2016 Irish television series debuts
2010s in Irish television
Irish television shows
Television shows set in the Republic of Ireland
RTÉ original programming